The following is a list of first official international association football matches for each (present or past) member of FIFA, played between 1940 and 1962. The matches are listed chronologically.


Croatia

Lebanon

Puerto Rico

Afghanistan and Iran

Syria

Mongolia

Tanzania

Iceland

Albania

Zambia

Ethiopia and Djibouti

Madagascar and Mauritius

China PR

South Korea

Israel

Hong Kong

South Vietnam

Macau

Cyprus

Sierra Leone and Nigeria

Pakistan

Ghana

Saarland

Myanmar

New Caledonia

Vanuatu

Fiji

Sri Lanka

East Germany

Tahiti

Singapore

Malaysia

Palestine

Libya

Jordan

Chinese Taipei

Cambodia

North Vietnam

North Korea

Togo

Sudan

Thailand

Malta

Algeria

Saudi Arabia

Morocco and Iraq

Benin

Ivory Coast

Burkina Faso and Gabon

Cameroon

Mali and Central African Republic

Congo

Guinea

Kuwait

Laos

Senegal

Malawi

Gambia

See also
List of first association football internationals per country: before 1940
List of first association football internationals per country: since 1962

Notes
A. RSSSF list three matches played in Hong Kong in 1949, 1950 and 1953 between "China" and South Korea whose status is not officially recognized by FIFA.
B.Prior to Algerian independence in 1962, matches were organised under the auspices of the Front de Libération Nationale.
C.There is some confusion as to the order and results of the two matches played between Cambodia and Malaya in the 1956 Asian Cup Qualification tournament. The RFFFS page for Cambodia shows Cambodia losing 2–3 to Malaya on 17 March and losing 2–9 to Malaya on 24 April, with both matches played in Malaya. The Elo site for Cambodia shows the same results, but with the match on 17 March being played in Cambodia. The RFFFS page for the Asian Cup shows the matches as 9–2 to Malaya on 17 March (played in Malaya) and 3–2 to Cambodia on 24 April (played in Cambodia). As the Elo rankings are based on Cambodia losing both matches, this is assumed to be correct
D.The RSSSF page for Saudi Arabia lists the first match as being played on 20 October 1957 against Syria in the 1957 Pan Arab Games, whereas the RSSSF article on these games lists the first match as being played against the hosts, Lebanon, on 18 October. This is supported by the Elo page for Saudi Arabia.

References

External links
Index of European national team matches up to the end of 1989
The RSSSF Archive - International Country Results
The Association of Football Statisticians: National football team sites
World Football Elo Ratings

1940–1962